Motipur is a Village Development Committee in Rupandehi District in Lumbini Province of southern Nepal. At the time of the 1991 Nepal census it had a population of 5601 people residing in 927 individual households. It is now combined with Butwal municipality to form Butwal sub-metropolitan city.

References

Populated places in Rupandehi District